Orthenches chlorocoma is a moth of the family Plutellidae first described by Edward Meyrick in 1885. It is endemic to New Zealand and has been observed in the North and South Islands.

Taxonomy 
This species was first described by Edward Meyrick in November 1885 and named Orthenches chlorocoma. In 1886 Meyrick described this species in greater detail. Meyrick used larvae collected in Christchurch from whom he bred one adult specimen in April. George Hudson discussed and illustrated this species in his 1928 book The butterflies and moths of New Zealand. The male holotype is held at the Natural History Museum, London.

Description
Meyrick described the adult of the species as follows:

Meyrick then went on to describe the larva and pupa of the species as follows:

Distribution
This species is endemic to New Zealand and has been observed in the North and South Islands.

Habitat and hosts 
This species feeds on native broom species in the genus Carmichaelia including Carmichaelia australis.

References

Plutellidae
Moths of New Zealand
Moths described in 1885
Endemic fauna of New Zealand
Taxa named by Edward Meyrick
Endemic moths of New Zealand